Askari, also rendered as Asgari, may refer to:
 Askari, Bushehr
 Askari, Kangan, Bushehr Province
 Asgari, Kohgiluyeh and Boyer-Ahmad